Chauncey Brunson Welton (September 1, 1844 – January 2, 1908) was an American businessman and politician.

Born in Sharon Center, Medina County, Ohio, Welton moved to Wisconsin in 1855. He then moved back to Ohio in 1858. During the American Civil War, Welton served in the 103rd Ohio Infantry from 1862 to 1865. After the Civil War, Welton was in the mercantile business and lived in Allegan, Michigan, Kalamazoo, Michigan, Rockton, Wisconsin, and Windsor, Wisconsin. In 1881, Welton served as town clerk for Whitestown, Wisconsin in Vernon County, Wisconsin. Then, in 1884, Welton permanently moved to Madison, Wisconsin and was the owner of a clothing business. From 1897 to 1901, Welton served in the Wisconsin State Senate and was a Republican. Welton died at his home in Madison, Wisconsin.

Notes

External links

1844 births
1908 deaths
Politicians from Madison, Wisconsin
People from Medina County, Ohio
People of Ohio in the American Civil War
Businesspeople from Madison, Wisconsin
Republican Party Wisconsin state senators
Burials in Wisconsin
19th-century American politicians
19th-century American businesspeople